In 2003 Tipperary competed in the National Hurling League and the Munster and All-Ireland championships. 
On 5 November 2002 Michael Doyle was appointed manager of the team, along with selectors Liam Sheedy and Kevin Fox.
It was Doyle's first year in charge of the team with Brian O'Meara named as team captain. Finches continued as sponsors of Tipperary GAA.
Doyle resigned as manager in September after one year in charge.

National Hurling League

Division 1B table

Group 1 table

Knock-out stage

2003 Munster Senior Hurling Championship

2003 All-Ireland Senior Hurling Championship

Awards
Tipperary won one All Star Award with goalkeeper Brendan Cummins picking up his third award.

References

External links
Tipperary GAA Archives 2003
2003 Teams and Results at Premierview
Tipperary v Kilkenny 17 August 2003 Highlights at YouTube

Tipp
Tipperary county hurling team seasons